Big River (West Coast, New Zealand) may refer to:

 Big River (Buller), a river in the Buller District that is a tributary of the Blackwater River (Little Grey River tributary)
 Big River (Grey), a river in the Grey District that flows into the Grey River

See also
 Big River (Tasman), a river in the Tasman District that flows into the Tasman Sea on the west coast of New Zealand's South Island